This is a list of public art in St James's, a district in the City of Westminster, London.

St James's lies to the north of St James's Park, a former hunting ground attached to St James's Palace. The Mall, marking the northern boundary of the park, was transformed into a major thoroughfare in the 1900s by Aston Webb as part of the national memorial to Queen Victoria. Its focal point looking west is the Victoria Memorial designed by Thomas Brock, one of several memorials set along its axis from the early 20th century onwards. To the east The Mall joins John Nash's processional route (which originally connected Carlton House to Regent's Park) at Carlton House Terrace. The part of this route within St James's includes Waterloo Place, described as "one of the more dramatic pieces of town planning in London" and lined with statues and memorials mainly of a military character. Elsewhere in the district, the Economist Plaza hosted changing displays of contemporary sculpture in the early 21st century; this programme came to an end in 2010 after running for over ten years.

Royal Institute of Painters in Water Colours

References

Bibliography

 

 

 

 

Saint James's
Public art